The 2011 Central Bedfordshire Council electionfor the  Central Bedfordshire Council were held on 5 May 2011, along with other United Kingdom local elections. The whole council was up for election following boundary changes, with each successful candidate serving a four-year term of office, expiring in 2015.

All councillors defending their seats this year were first elected in 2009, when the council was formed.

The Conservative Party retained an overall control on the council, winning 49 of the 59 seats on the council. Of the remaining 10 seats, 4 were won by the Liberal Democrats, 4 were won by Independents and the Labour Party won its first seat on the council.

Result

	
The overall turnout was 41.73% with a total of 160,448 valid votes cast.

Council Composition
Prior to the election the composition of the council was:

After the election, the composition of the council was:

I - Independent 
L - Labour

Ward Results
Asterisks denote incumbent Councillors seeking re-election. All results are listed below:

Ampthill

Arlesey

Councillors Drinkwater and Dalgarno previously served as a Conservative Party Councillor in the Silsoe and Shillington ward Stotfold and Arlesey ward respectively.

Aspley & Woburn

Barton-Le-Clay

Janet Nunn previously served as a councillor in the Barton Ward.

Biggleswade North

Councillors Lawrence and Jones both previously served as Councillors for the Biggleswade ward.

Biggleswade South

Councillors Lawrence and Vickers both previously served as Councillors for the Biggleswade ward.

Caddington

Councillors Gammons and Stay both previously served as Councillors for the South East Bedfordshire ward.

Cranfield & Marston Stable

Councillor Matthews previously served as a Councillor in the Cranfield ward and Roger Baker was previously elected as a Conservative Party councillor in the Marston ward.

Dunstable Central

Councillor Hegley previously served as a Councillor in the Dunstable Downs ward.

Dunstable Icknield

Councillor McVicar previously served as a Councillor in the Icknield ward.

Dunstable Manshead

Councillor Kane previously served as a Councillor in the Icknield ward.

Dunstable Northfields

Councillor Murray and Jeannette Freeman previously served as Councillors in the Northfields ward.

Dunstable Watling

Councillors Hollick and Sparrow previously served as Councillors in the Watling ward.

Eaton Bray

Councillor Mustoe previously served as a councillor in the South West Bedfordshire ward.

Flitwick

Councillor Turner previously served as a councillor in the Flitwick East ward.

Heath & Reach

Houghton Conquest & Haynes

Angela Barker was elected unopposed, after having previously served as a councillor in the Maulden & Houghton Conquest ward.

Houghton Hall

Councillors Goodchild and Jones previously served as councillors in the Houghton Regis ward.

Leighton Buzzard North

Councillors Johnstone and Spurr previously served as councillors in the Leighton Linslade Central ward.

Leighton Buzzard South

Councillor Berry previously served as a councillor in the Grovebury ward and Councillor Bowater previously served as a councillor in the Leighton Linslade Central ward.

Linslade

Councillor Hopkin and Peter Snelling previously served as councillors in the Southcott ward.

Northill

Councillor Turner previously served as a councillor in the Northill & Blunham ward.

Parkside

Councillor Egan previously served as a councillor in the Houghton Regis ward.

Potton

Councillor Gurney and Anita Lewis previously served as councillors in the Potton ward.

Sandy

Councillor Aldis previously served as a councillor in the Sandy ward.

Shefford

Councillors Birt and Brown previously served as councillors in the Shefford ward.

Silsoe & Shillington

Alison Graham previously served as a councillor in the Silsoe and Shillington ward.

Stotfold & Langford

Councillor John Saunders previously served as a councillor in the Stotfold and Arlesey ward and Councillor Clarke previously served as a councillor in the Langford, Bedfordshire|Langford and Henlow Village ward.

Tithe Farm

Councillor Williams previously served as a councillor in the Houghton Regis ward.

Toddington

Councillors Nicols and Costin previously served as councillors in the Toddington ward.

Westoning, Flitton & Greenfield

Councillor Jamieson previously served as a councillor in the Flitwick East ward.

References

External links

2011
2011 English local elections